Life OK was an Indian pay television channel owned by Star India. It was launched on 18 December 2011 replacing Star One. The Channel was replaced by Star Bharat on 28 August 2017.

This is the list of original programming formerly broadcast by the Indian television channel Life OK.

Comedy series

Alaxmi Ka Super Parivaar
Bahu Hamari Rajni Kant
Comedy Classes
Har Mard Ka Dard
May I Come In Madam

Drama series

Aasman Se Aage
The Adventures of Hatim
Ajeeb Daastaan Hai Ye
Amrit Manthan
Baawre
Dafa 420
Dil Se Di Dua... Saubhagyavati Bhava?
Do Dil Ek Jaan
Dream Girl - Ek Ladki Deewani Si
Ek Boond Ishq
Ek Nayi Ummeed - Roshni
Ek Tha Chander Ek Thi Sudha
Ghulaam
Gustakh Dil
Hum Ne Li Hai...Shapath
Jaane Kya Hoga Rama Re
Junoon - Aisi Nafrat Toh Kaisa Ishq
Kaisa Yeh Ishq Hai... Ajab Sa Risk Hai
Kalash - Ek Vishwaas
Laut Aao Trisha
Main Lakshmi Tere Aangan Ki
Mere Rang Mein Rangne Waali
Meri Maa
Naagarjuna - Ek Yoddha
Nadaan Parindey
Piya Rangrezz
Prem Ya Paheli - Chandrakanta 
Pukaar - Call For The Hero
Rakshak
Rishton Ka Saudagar - Baazigar
Savdhaan India – India Fights Back
Savitri
Sher-e-Punjab: Maharaja Ranjit Singh
Tum Dena Saath Mera
Tumhari Paakhi

Horror/supernatural series

Khauff Begins... Ringa Ringa Roses
Maha Kumbh: Ek Rahasaya, Ek Kahani
SuperCops vs Supervillains
Zindagi Abhi Baaki Hai Mere Ghost

Reality/non-scripted programming

The Bachelorette India
Dare 2 Dance
Hindustan Ke Hunarbaaz
Laugh India Laugh
Mazaak Mazaak Mein
Sacch Ka Saamna
Welcome – Baazi Mehmaan Nawazi Ki

Mythological series

Bhakton Ki Bhakti Mein Shakti
Devon Ke Dev...Mahadev
Ramleela – Ajay Devgn Ke Saath

References

Life OK

Disney Star